Eugene Thomas Larkin (born October 24, 1962) is an American former switch-hitting first baseman, designated hitter, and right fielder in Major League Baseball who played his entire seven-season career with the Minnesota Twins. During his playing career he wore #9 for Minnesota, and was a member of both the 1987 and 1991 World Series championship teams. He is best known for hitting the series-winning single, a deep fly ball that was not caught by the Braves' drawn-in outfield and scored Dan Gladden from third base during the tenth inning in Game 7 of the 1991 Series.

Larkin was one of seven Twins to be part of both the 1987 and 1991 World Series teams. The other six were Randy Bush, Greg Gagne, Kirby Puckett, Al Newman, Kent Hrbek and Gladden.

Larkin attended Columbia University, where he played for the Lions and was later drafted in the 20th round of the  amateur draft. He was the first alumnus of Columbia University to make the major leagues since Lou Gehrig. He also graduated from Chaminade High School in Mineola, New York. He lives in Eden Prairie, Minnesota, where he coaches youth travel baseball and is the Vice President of Players Only Incorporated, where he does private and group instruction.

In a 758-game major league career, Larkin compiled a .266 batting average (618-for-2321) with 275 runs, 32 home runs and 266 RBI. He recorded a .992 fielding percentage at first base and right and left field. In the postseason, in 1987 and 1991 for the Twins, he hit .273 (3-for-11) with 2 RBI.

References

External links

1962 births
Living people
American people of Irish descent
Sportspeople from Queens, New York
Baseball players from New York City
Major League Baseball first basemen
Major League Baseball designated hitters
Minnesota Twins players
Orlando Twins players
Columbia Lions baseball players
Chaminade High School alumni
All-American college baseball players
Elizabethton Twins players
Portland Beavers players
Visalia Oaks players